

Liga Nacional de Fútbol de Guatemala

2006–07 teams

 Comunicaciones
 Heredia
 Jalapa
 Marquense
 Mictlán
 Municipal
 Petapa
 Suchitepéquez
 Xelajú
 Zacapa

Apertura

Standings

Quarterfinals

 Municipal advances 3 - 0 on aggregate
 Jalapa advances 4 - 3 on aggregate

Semifinals

 Municipal advances 3 - 1 on aggregate.
 Comunicaciones advances 5 - 2 on aggregate.

Final

 Municipal winners 2006–07 Apertura on away goal.

Clausura

Standings

Quarterfinals

 Marquense 2 - 2 Suchitepéquez on aggregate, Marquense won on better regular season finish.
 Xelajú advances 4 - 2 on aggregate.

Semifinals

 Marquense advances 3 - 0 on aggregate.
 Xelajú advances 4 - 2 on aggregate.

Final

 Xelajú winners 2006–07 Clausura.

Relegation

Aggregate table

 Mictlán automatically relegated to second division.
 Heredia and Suchitepéquez to promotion/relegation playoff.

Playoffs

 Suchitepéquez and Heredia saved.
 Cobán Imperial and Sacachispas stay in second division.

External links
 RSSSF.com - Guatemala 2006/07